Memorial Field may refer to:

Airports
 Memorial Field Airport, serving Hot Springs, Arkansas, United States (FAA: HOT)
 Archer Memorial Field, serving St. Johns, Michigan, United States (FAA: 2S3)
 Chapman Memorial Field, serving Centerburg, Ohio, United States (FAA: 6CM)
 Dexter B. Florence Memorial Field, serving of Arkadelphia, Arkansas, United States (FAA: M89)
 Ed Carlson Memorial Field, also known as South Lewis County Airport, serving Toledo/Winlock, Washington, United States (FAA: TDO)
 Frankfort Dow Memorial Field, serving Frankfort, Michigan, United States (FAA: FKS)
 H. A. Clark Memorial Field, serving Williams, Arizona, United States (FAA: CRM)
 James G. Whiting Memorial Field, serving Mapleton, Iowa, United States (FAA: MEY)
 Karl Stefan Memorial Field, also known as Norfolk Regional Airport, serving Norfolk, Nebraska, United States (FAA: OFK)
 Kevin Burke Memorial Field, also known as Anita Municipal Airport, serving Anita, Iowa, United States (FAA: Y43)
 Lenzen-Roe Memorial Field, also known as Granite Falls Municipal Airport, serving Granite Falls, Minnesota, United States (FAA: GDB)
 Miley Memorial Field, serving Big Piney/Marbleton, Wyoming, United States (FAA: BPI)
 Noble F. Lee Memorial Field, also known as Lakeland Airport, serving Minocqua/Woodruff, Wisconsin, United States (FAA: ARV)

Sporting

 Kearney Memorial Field, baseball field for University of Nebraska at Kearney
 Memorial Field (Dartmouth), the football field at Dartmouth College
 Alumni Memorial Field, the football field at the Virginia Military Institute

See also 
 Memorial Coliseum (disambiguation)
 Memorial Gymnasium (disambiguation)
 Memorial Park (disambiguation)
 Memorial Stadium (disambiguation)